is a Japanese manga series written and illustrated by Tooru Fujisawa. It was published in Kodansha's Weekly Shōnen Magazine from October 1990 to October 1996, compiled in 31 tankōbon volumes, and has been re-released in a deluxe edition of 15 volumes, from May to December 2005. The story follows the youth of Eikichi Onizuka and his best friend Ryuuji Danma while they are still in high school but have already formed their shock duo the Oni-Baku Combi.

Multiple adaptations were established during the series’ run, such as a five-episode anime OVA series released on VHS from 1994 to 1997, a Japanese television drama, and several live action movies. The deluxe edition of the manga has been licensed for North America by Tokyopop, which retitled it GTO: The Early Years, although the editions retain Shonan Junai Gumi as a subtitle. The first volume was released in June 2006. The Tokyopop editions ended with volume 10. Publisher Vertical Inc continued and concluded the series in 2012.

This is the manga series that introduced the character Eikichi Onizuka, who would later star in the more popular sequel series Great Teacher Onizuka. As of January 2020, Shonan Junai Gumi had over 45 million copies in circulation, making it one of the best-selling manga series in history.

Plot
The story of Shonan Junai Gumi deals with the Oni-Baku (Demon Explosion) duo, consisting of Eikichi Onizuka and Ryuuji Danma, and their quest to lose their virginity and reach maturity. They are widely feared bōsōzoku, and are known for their tenacity and viciousness in a fight. However, this lifestyle does not endear them to the opposite gender, so they decide to change their ways. However, this is easier said than done. As the story unfolds, we meet the Oni-Baku's wide range of friends and foes, and the crazy situations they all get into. The story begins as a gag manga, but more serious issues present themselves as it continues, eventually striking a balance similar to that of GTO (which this manga predates).

Characters

Oni-Baku-gumi and friends
 
 
 Japanese Live action actor: Naoki Miyashita (1995), Kanichiro Sato (2020)
 A former member of the Running-Wild Angels 暴走天使 (Bousou Tenshi) biker gang, otherwise known as the Midnight Angels, Eikichi looked on the leader Kyousuke Masaki as an elder brother. He met Ryuji Danma at Junior High (see Bad Company), where there was animosity between them, but it settled down into the strong friendship they now share. Deadly in a fight but not so skilled when it comes to dealing with women, Eikichi is a nice guy at heart (as seen in GTO) and despite his rowdy behaviour, he always manages to help people out. He lives with his mother in an apartment. Eikichi rides a Kawasaki Zephyr 1100, but is also the owner of Masaki's ZII.
 
 
 Japanese Live action actor: Yamaguchi Yoshiyuki (1995), Daichi Kaneko (2020)
 The other member of the Oni-baku (Devil-bomb) duo, Ryuji is taller and maybe slightly more restrained than his partner, although get in his bad books and you're in for big trouble. He has more luck with women, having had a relationship with his teacher Ayumi, and later Nagisa (seen in GTO). Ryuji's family are nice, normal people, who appear quite wealthy, who totally disapprove of his 'bad behaviour', however his elder sister Yoko allows him to stay at her home when he needs to. His younger brother is called Yoshitaka. Ryuji rides a Honda CBX-400F, as seen in Bad Company.
 He is a mechanic and runs a motorbike store in GTO and GTO: Paradise Lost. He is also involved in illegal races in GT-R.
 
 
 Along with his partner Kamata, he is feared as Kamakura no Kyouken (the Mad Dogs of Kamakura). This duo were renowned for their brutality, including shoving pencils through people's noses (which proves to be very ironic). However after being beaten by the Oni-Baku, the pair decided to join their gang. Saejima has a malevolent face, so much so that girls are afraid of him and assume he is a Yakuza. He, like Ryuji, comes from a fairly well-to-do family, who are terrified of him- his sisters speak to him through a lock on their bedroom door, and his parents jump at his slightest movement. Saejima rides a Kawasaki. In GTO manga, he's a corrupt police officer. In GTO anime, he also appears in shorts where he gives updates from Shonan characters as well as having his criminal acts highlighted.
 In Ino-Head Gargoyle, supposedly taking place after GTO, we see him as police officer in Inokashira Park joining forces once again with Jun Kamata in acts at the edge of legality.
 
 
 Kamata first appeared as a bad guy with his buddy Saejima, but when the Oni-Baku beat them they changed their ways. Kamata is shown to be incredibly strong, beating whole gangs when he's in a bad mood. He has a younger sibling, Kaoru, who causes all sorts of misunderstandings. Kamata has a painful history- he spent his childhood with his best friend Natsu and his older sister, but her rape at the hands of a vicious gang caused her to commit suicide. Natsu then killed the perpetrators, but Jun had arrived with some adults who took him away, shouting 'Traitor!' at his former friend. Jun leaves Shonan for the United States, honoring a promise he made, but makes an appearance in the final volume working in a bar. Kamata rides a Honda Steed.
 He comes back to Japan in Ino-Head Gargoyle taking the role of a junior officer to avenge what drug dealers did to his little brother. He is helped by Saejima, Nakajo and Akustsu.
 
 
 From Iwamisawa in Hokkaidō, Abe appears as a serial womaniser, attracting the girls left right and centre with his expensive clothes and confident personality. This understandably irritated the Oni-Baku, until they persuade him to reveal his secrets. He joins the gang, and is a loyal friend in numerous situations, such as the Midnight Angels affair and the fight with Kamata and Saejima. Abe vanishes midway through the manga, but since no mention is made of it, he is probably supposed to still be around but not in the spotlight. Abe apparently rides a Honda CBX 1000. In GTO we learn from Saejima that he had become the owner of several stores, but recently has fallen onto hard times and now manages a single store (Saejima also claims he is bald and impotent).
 
 Voiced by: Takumi Yamazaki (Ep. 1, 2), Toshiyuki Morikawa (Ep. 4)
 A student at Enoshima Yonchuu Junior High School before coming to Tsujidou, Tsukai was a member of the 'Shitennou' (Four Heavenly Kings, meaning the strongest guys at the school). He was also a kohai of Kunito Nakajo, meaning he has knowledge of things other members of the Oni-Baku gang don't. He has a crush on Yui Itou, and later in the series she becomes his girlfriend. Tsukai is a strong fighter, and often has to overcome harsh odds to win, but always seems to come out on top. That said, he is not quite in the Oni-Baku's league.
 By the time of GTO Saejima says he is married to Itou and they had a child. He also says he joined an athletic club and in GTO: Shonan 14 days we see he still hasn't stopped being a biker along with Katsuyuki.
 
 
 Makoto is a loyal member of the Oni-Baku-gumi and despite his reasonably limited fighting skills he is always there to support his friends. He is very successful with women, and later settles on a girl called Mami. He was bullied by Saejima and Kamata before their reformation and was later manipulated to betray Eikichi when the Kamakura and Shonan gangs first met. However, he was brave enough to remain loyal to his friends.
 Makoto is notable for being one of the few characters to actually change their hairdo over the course of the series, which he does a number of times.
 
 
 Katsuyuki is the leader of the K.T. Butai (Katsuyuki Tsumoto Fighting Group), a kind of ‘sub-unit’ of the Oni-Baku gang, consisting of Yasuo, Atsushi, Saegusa, Kitamura and numerous other students. He has a hair-trigger temper, and as such can cause a lot of trouble without thinking about it. He has a rivalry with Tamura, and a long-standing grudge against Kenkichi Hino. He once fought Eikichi, but was beaten and decided to adopt him as a role model. He is loyal to the Oni-Baku and will fight anyone who badmouths them, but his main allegiance is to Eikichi.
 During GTO: Shonan 14 days we see he is working in junkyard but he still finds time to be in a biker gang along with Tsukai.
 
 A member of Katsuyuki's gang, Yasuo is incredibly loyal to 'Ka-chan' (as he calls him) and therefore also to Onizuka (although he initially disliked the Oni-Baku's control over everyone in their school). He holds a major grudge against Enoshima Shogyou (Enoshou) students, and is mainly seen in conflict with them. Although not a major character, Yasuo appears fairly often, even having starring roles in certain chapters. He rides a Yamaha XJ-R, and has a girlfriend called Mayumi.
 
 Bearing a resemblance to both Saejima and Makoto, Saegusa is another member of the K.T. Butai. He is not a major character, but appears with his 'boss' and his friends at various times. Saegusa is not afraid of a fight, as shown by his actions in a cafe full of Enoshou students while being vastly outnumbered, and appears in many fights as backup. He rides a Honda CB-SF.
 
 The least regularly seen of the K.T. Butai, Kitamura is still present from time to time as a minor character. He is present when the Oni-Baku meet Saejima's new partner Kiwamezawa, and is jumpy at his every move (considering Kiwamezawa is 6'8" tall). Besides his appearances in minor capacities, Kitamura is not a very important character.
 
 Yet another member of the K.T. Butai, Atsushi is the recipient of numerous injuries at the hands of the Oni-Baku-gumi's enemies- he is attacked by the zombie-like Yagyou Atsuki, and later is smashed in the throat by one of Joey's DOA gang members with a piece of wood. However, he is present in the major fights, and always remains loyal to his senpai Onizuka, and his friend Katsuyuki.
 
 
 Itou first appears to clue the Oni-Baku in on their opponents Kamata and Saejima. She graduated from the same Junior High as they did. She develops a crush on Eikichi, but he is too busy fighting with the others over Kaoru, and this leads to a fight between Tsukai and Onizuka. She is Tsukai’s girlfriend for the duration of the series and in GTO we learn from Saejima that the two are married with a child. She is the first girl to be considered a part of the Oni-Baku-gumi, and mainly appears in later volumes at their gatherings.
 
 
 Japanese Live action actor: Satou Shinobu (1995), Misato Morita (2020)
 Shinomi had been a fat and rather unattractive girl who was defended by Eikichi. She reappears as a beautiful young woman who is involved with Takezawa Akira of the Idaten gang. After Takezawa is hospitalised after fighting Eikichi and he breaks up with her, she dyes her hair blonde and befriends the Oni-Baku-gumi. She has an attraction to Eikichi throughout the series, but since he sees her more like a sister he is reluctant to embark on a relationship with her. She becomes a friend of Nagisa’s, and is often seen hanging around with her. Shinomi is feisty and packs a good punch, and personality-wise is the female Eikichi, so they are pretty well suited. Shinomi appears in GTO as Tomoko's makeup artist, and at the end of the series seems to catch on to the identity of Tomoko and Mayu's teacher. She also appears in GTO: Shonan 14 Days (set between volumes 19 and 20 of GTO), lending a hand temporarily as the second caretaker at White Swan (although her real job is as a makeup artist).
 
 
Japanese Live action actor: Kasumi Yamaya (2020)
 Nagisa first appears working in the Marine House seafood restaurant as a waitress, catching Ryuji's attention with her t-back bikini. However, although she seems sweet and innocent, she suffers from dissociative identity disorder, and has an evil side who calls herself Yasha. She is a member of the Midnight Angels gang under Junya Akutsu, and is his girlfriend. Her mental disorder arose after he raped her in the past. Ryuji saves her life, and she eventually overcomes her problems and becomes his girlfriend. They are still together in GTO.
 
 Inspired by his grandfather's dying words to become a 'strong man', the small and bullied Yoshio decides to change his life by joining the Oni-Baku-gumi. However, his overzealous approach to fighting gets him in trouble with Eikichi and Ryuji. He then takes control of the Atsuki Yagyou gang, who have been ruining the Oni-Baku's reputation, leading to a confrontation. He pulls a gun on Eikichi, but because it is old it misfires, injuring his hands. He never appears again after this.

Foes
 
 
 An eyebrow-less boxing champion who tricks Eikichi with a knuckle-duster and evasive maneuvers- he finally wins by smashing Eikichi with a street sign. While a reasonably good fighter, he only won because Eikichi wasn’t expecting him to be trained- the next time they cross paths, Ryuji takes down the whole gang singlehanded while Eikichi beats Machida’s teeth out, taking the boxer’s punches and hitting him back harder.
 
 A moustachioed yakuza successor, and formerly the Oni-Baku’s senpai. They totally dominated him and made his life hell (we also see this in Bad Company) but really he just gets what he deserves most of the time. He doesn’t really appear much after this, but we see his reaction to the Oni-Baku's fate in the final volume-he is, unsurprisingly, not too saddened by the news.
 
 
 Okuba studied at of Kyokuto High School, he is known as Eguriya (Slasher) Okubo because of his vicious use of a knife in fights. As a member of the Madara gang, he causes trouble for the Oni-Baku when he appears- it turns out he had attacked Eikichi and stabbed him in the back during a fight, and wants to finish him for good this time. However, Eikichi gets the better of him in their fight, and beats him to within an inch of his life despite having a broken foot.
 
 The younger brother of Ayumi's deceased fiancé, Fumiya wants to destroy her new relationship with Ryuji. A student at Kyokuto High school, Fumiya has a large gang who do his bidding, one member of which is Asakura Yoshiaki. Fumiya is defeated by Ryuji after kidnapping Ayumi, and later appears as an ally. He rides a Yamaha V-Max.
 In GTO: Shonan 14 days he helps Onizuka and he is revealed to have become a Tokyo Artists Production Representative. 
 
 
 The second leader of the Midnight Angels gang, Akutsu was a friend and kohai of Kyousuke Masaki, and was jealous of Eikichi taking some of Masaki's attention years before. He reappears full of plans to reclaim the Midnight Angels' place as the greatest of all Shonan gangs, with the Idaten (previously led by Akira Takezawa) under his control. He is also in control of Nagisa, and tries to get her to kill Ryuji, although she ends up injured herself. Akutsu has a penchant for setting petrol fires, and has made a nemesis of Toshiki Kamishima of the Satsuriku Butai (Butcher Fighting Gang) for causing him serious injuries in this way when they were both members of the second-generation Midnight Angels. He is beaten by Onizuka and Kamishima, and returns later in the series assisting the Oni-Baku in times of need.
 In GTO: Shonan 14 days he is seen driving a sportcar at the head of the reborn "Midnight Angel". Katsuyuki points out he hasn't changed a bit and he is still crazy.
 In Ino-Head Gargoyle he is in Tokyo with Nakajo helping Kamata in his revenge. He is sometimes followed by members of his gang.
 
 Leader of the Blue Rose gang, Kashiya is a Yakuza successor. He is always smoking, and is known as the 'Tobacco Guy'. He controls a lot of smaller gangs such as DOA, and never directly gets involved with fighting himself if he can avoid it. He has a history with Kunito Nakajo, and the two often clash over events in Shonan.
 In GTO: Shonan 14 days he has matured from his reckless days and he is a sub-boss of the Yokohama Group.
 
 The leader of the Idaten gang, Takezawa is the boyfriend of Shinomi Fujisaki. However, after being hospitalised by Onizuka he disappears and breaks up with her. His gang fall under the control of Akutsu and the Midnight Angels, but he returns to reclaim leadership and despite Akutsu's orders the gang will not attack Takezawa. He later appears when Eikichi finds a new girlfriend in Misato Hazuki, recognising her as a former Idaten member, even though she is now very different than she once was.
 
 Leader of the DOA gang, who operate as part of the Blue Rose coalition, Joey is impervious to pain as a side effect of the medicine he takes to counteract his illness. He had a girlfriend Yoko, who met a tragic end, and this haunts him even now. Joey comes up against the Oni-Baku in a fight, which ends in a stalemate, and races Onizuka, but crashes and falls into the ocean. His brother saves him, and he appears to gain some sense of the mistakes he had made in his life.
 In GTO: Shonan 14 days we see him still alive and well as owner of the L-club in Yokosuka.
 
 Known as 'Shinigami' Natsu, is half American and half Japanese, was the best friend of Jun Kamata when they were young, until his elder sister Fuyuka committed suicide after being violently attacked and raped by a gang of thugs. Natsu went and slaughtered the perpetrators, but a worried Jun had gathered some adults to help find him, and they took Natsu away, calling his friend a traitor. Over the next few years, Natsu viciously beat and killed any who opposed him, earning the hatred of the Yokohama Kihei. This caused his death, as Nakagaki shot him in the back as he was helping Kamata up. Honouring a childhood promise to Natsu, Kamata left Shonan for the United States soon after.
  (Yokohama Kihei No. 1)
 First appearing in Volume 8, Nakagaki is a nasty piece of work whose aim is to simply prove that his gang are more powerful than the Shonan gangs. He interferes in a fight between Katsuyuki and Tamura, and with Mauchi beats them both down. The two of them also take out a diner full of Enoshou students with no assistance. Nakagaki has a grudge against Natsu (a flashback in volume 8 explains his facial scar), and kills him during the fight with the Oni-Baku and Nakajo’s gang with a bullet in the chest. Eikichi then beats Nakagaki to a pulp.
  (Yokohama Kihei No. 2)
 Mauchi is not a very talkative character (and often wears a surgical mask) so it’s easy to underestimate him and assume he’s just a lackey for Nakagaki. However, he beats up numerous gang members through the Yokohama arc and while Nakajo is able to take him down with ease, Nakagaki summarily beats Nakajo by smashing a chair over his head. They operate well as a unit, as seen when they beat up Katsuyuki and Tamura. Mauchi is quite resilient, since he takes a blow to the neck with an iron bar and gets up shortly after and fights Ryuji. Kamata beats him down after Onizuka obliterates Nakagaki.
 
 
 Kamishima used to be a member of the Inamura subdivision of the second-generation Midnight Angels, and is now the leader of the Satsuriku Butai. Kamishima leads Kamakura's Satsuriku Butai against his nemesis Junya Akutsu, who caused the scars on his face and body by dousing him in petrol and setting him alight during a previous fight for control of Shonan. He is also against the Oni-Baku-gumi, making the fight three-way. He is thoroughly beaten by Akutsu, and later caught in an explosion the latter caused. He rides a Kawasaki GPZ900R. During the conflict with the Atsuki Yagyou gang, who are ruining the Oni-Baku’s reputation with violent attacks, a member of the gang appears riding a GPZ900R, their face covered in bandages, initially tricking the Oni-Baku into thinking he's Kamishima. Kamishima appears at the end of the series in an institution fully healed save for his original scars. However, he does appear to have been driven totally insane.

Other characters
 
 
 Japanese Live action actor: Nin Nakayama (1995), Yanagi Yurina (2020)
 The Oni-Baku meet Ayumi and Mariko at Yoron Shima in volume 1; while Eikichi sees it as a chance to ‘get lucky’, we get the impression that Ryuji is greatly taken with Ayumi. Despite the revelation that the two women are not students as they claim, but are teachers at their new school, the romance continues for a time, despite Fumiya Shindouji’s attempts to break them up (it turns out Ayumi was engaged to his brother, who died). However, when the pair decide to marry, Ayumi realizes that she would be ruining Ryuji’s life by denying him the experiences of youth, and she leaves on a train. Ryuji is understandably heartbroken by this turn of events. Well, at least until he meets Nagisa. But even then Ayumi, in her rare appearances, manages to turn his head, to Nagisa’s extreme consternation.
 
 
Japanese Live action actor: Shiori Yoshida (2020)
 The Oni-Baku meet Ayumi and Mariko at Yoron Shima in volume 1; Eikichi sees it as a chance to ‘get lucky’ and is constantly trying to grope Mariko.
 With the revelation that the two women are not students as they claim, but are actually teachers at their new school, Eikichi seeks revenge on Mariko but eventually they get along. When Ayumi leaves, Mariko remains an occasional member of the SJG cast and mainly helps the pair out of difficult situations. She is also the daughter of a Yakuza boss, and a former member of Kadena Nao's 'Purple Haze' gang.
 
 
 Japanese Live action actor: Tachigawa Noriko
 A former car club member and street racer, Kadena is a teacher at Tsujikou, taking over from the absent Nanno. She uses her beauty to inspire her male students to work hard, and entices the girls with attractive university guys. She feels responsible for her younger brother Kazuhito being in a coma, because he crashed his car in a race with her. Onizuka lifts her out of her bad mood by racing her, showing that it can be fun if you aren't too reckless. She later 'helps' set Shinomi up with Eikichi, but things don't quite go right.
 In the anime adaptation of Great Teacher Onizuka, Nao Kadena takes the role of the school nurse played by Naoko Moritaka in the manga. Her techniques and past are remarkably similar to her character in Shonan Junai Gumi - though she was clearly introduced as a brand new acquaintance to the existing cast. In later storylines her actions were adaptations of Moritaka's from the manga.
 
 Minamino, or ‘Nanno’ as he is universally known, appears in volume 9 as a yakuza-esque teacher recruited to whip the delinquents into shape, which he does quite a good job of until he is challenged to a one-on-one fight against Ryuji, who refuses to accept his bullying tactics. Eikichi, Abe and Saejima, who know that even Ryuji is no match for Nanno’s ‘Hokuto Shin Ken’ style martial arts, dig around until they find an incriminating fact- Nanno has a lolita complex and bring the girl that got him in trouble, Myou-chan (who always has a black strip over her eyes) to the fight, and threaten to tell everyone if he doesn’t lose to Ryuji. So Ryuji wins, and Nanno is forced to be the Oni-Baku-gumi’s slave. He leaves the school after fighting Kiwamezawa and trying to escape the police.
 
 
 A friend of the Oni-Baku since their Midnight Angel days, he runs the Sato family garage and repair shop. He first appears to tell Eikichi that his car design won’t win the exhibition, and gets taken hostage by Yokokawa until his KS Benz is repaired. He later appears in the Akutsu affair, and at various other times when someone needs a bike fixed, or Onizuka wants to use Masaki’s ZII.
 
 
 Nakajo is the main leader of all the Enoshima gangs, he is a student at Enoshima Shogyou High School. He was Tsukai’s senpai at Enoshima Yonchuu Junior High, and controlled the Enoshima subdivision of the second-generation Midnight Angels. Nakajo has numerous facial scars, and works at the Select petrol station. In the past, the Oni-Baku beat his entire gang, which means there is some tension between them, but Nakajo is a useful ally in many conflicts, such as against the Yokohama Kihei and the Atsuki Yagyou. Despite the constant ill will between the Enoshima and Tsujikou students, Nakajo remains detached from most of the fighting until later volumes, and at the end of the story he challenges Eikichi to a one on one fight.
 In Ino-Head Gargoyle he is in Tokyo with Akutsu helping Kamata in his revenge. He is still very protective when it comes to his car.
 
 Tamura first appears as the second-in-command of Toshiki Kamishima, in the Satsuriku Butai of Kamakura. Here his rivalry with Katsuyuki begins, as the two clash with each other on numerous occasions. He is fighting Katsuyuki when the two are thoroughly thrashed by Nakagaki and Mauchi, the leaders of the Yokohama Kihei. During the resulting hospital, they fight over the attentions of the pretty nurse Nene Mihara (who had bern a member of a widely respected gang), but in dealing with Sakaki Ashura they put aside their differences. Later Tamura is Nakajo’s assistant, and still rivals with Katsuyuki.
 In GTO: Shonan 14 days his younger brother is at the head of a new Satsuriku Butai but he gets beat up by Onizuka along with his 50 members gang.
 Onizuka's mom
 The long suffering Mrs. Onizuka tries her hardest to tolerate Eikichi’s punkass behaviour, but eventually has to kick him out to keep her apartment. She herself is rather a tough lady, and apparently had her son at a young age. She works as a club hostess, according to the GTO B.A.D. Action guidebooks. Eikichi’s dad- the former head of the SPEED motorbike gang- is never seen, but he doesn’t seem to live with them. Mrs. Onizuka is still an attractive looking woman, with long brown(?) wavy hair. She does seem to dress older though.
 In GTO: Shonan 14 days it is revealed she has moved to Hawaii; in chapter 7, Onizuka mentions that his father was a womaniser, which probably explains his absence during the original Shonan Junai Gumi series.
 
 
 An underling of Fumiya’s (and therefore a Kyokuto student), Yoshiaki is beaten when the Oni-Baku take Fumiya down. He appears in the next volume under the control of Okubo, and is a reluctant pawn because Okubo kidnaps his girlfriend Natsumi. He turns on Okubo and helps Onizuka by getting Ryuji and the Oni-Baku-gumi to come to his aid (he was already suffering a broken foot, which had him at something of a disadvantage against an entire gang of armed punks). He appears after these events with Natsumi, and they appear to have returned to life as normal, and is seen during the Midnight Angels conflict causing problems for the police with his gang.
 
 2m (6’8) tall, Kiwamezawa first appears purchasing Sailor Moon magazines. He is a student at Kamakura Ryokuryou Kou, and Saejima recruits him as part of the ‘New Kamakura Combi’ after Kamata leaves. When a delivery man arrives who looks identical to Kiwamezawa, however, Saejima puts two and two together. It doesn’t seem like any of the family have done the same though. Kiwamezawa also appears when Saejima is hospitalised after a second altercation with some pencils.
 
 Sakaki transfers to Tsujikou from Asahikawa Nanryou High School in Hokkaidō, and calls himself ‘Kita no Shogun’ (The General of the North), ‘Hokkai no Maou’ (The Demon King of the North Sea) and ‘Okhotsk no kaidanji’ (Okhotsk's 'Mr. Nice Guy'). He seems to be impervious to pain, (even though he bleeds) since he takes numerous beatings to no real effect. His father is a famous boxer, known as 'Sandbag Sakaki'- his son shares his ability to absorb damage. It appears that he takes down Onizuka and Tsukai, and Katsuyuki and Tamura try to get revenge on him for this, however Tamura is injured and Katsuyuki has to find Ryuji. When they confront him, a huge gang of Asahikawa Nanryou High School students, led by Higashida, arrive, but they beat Sakaki up for causing trouble and apologise to the Oni-Baku for his behaviour. It also turns out that he hadn’t beaten Eikichi up, but Katsuyuki stabs him repeatedly anyway. He later appears during the Atsuki Yagyou crisis as a new student at the Oni-Baku's high school, where he is ignored by everyone (save Saejima, who finds him incredibly annoying).
 
 She is Jun Kamata’s younger sister. She first appears when the Oni-Baku-gumi arrange their ‘get-together’. Her brother bumps into her and recognises her (apparently they haven’t seen each other for a while) and spends the whole evening trying to keep the others away. Eikichi is obsessed with Kaoru and doesn’t pay any attention to Itou at all, which results in a fight with Tsukai. However, ‘she’ is actually a male and after the whole thing is solved he still dress up in front of Onizuka which never seems to realize the truth during the series.
In Ino-Head Gargoyle it's revealed he moved to Tokyo in order to become a police officer and got himself a girlfriend. Unfortunately while trying to bust a drug commerce he gets beaten into coma. This event brings Jun Kamata to come back in Japan to avenge him, helped by Saejima, Nakajo and Akutsu.
 
 Misato appears at the karaoke club where she meets Eikichi sitting sad, alone, tear-eyed, who has been tricked by some girls (whom he had thought had an interest in him) who left Eikichi there by himself to pay their expenses for them. Hazuki feels sorry for him, so she goes to him and emphasizes with him, and soon they start singing and having great fun. She pays for all the expenses then they go for a stroll outside in the night. Eikichi then takes her to his favourite place, a park from where they could see the mesmerising view of all the city lights in the darkness under the moonlight. Eikichi naturally falls for her. He asks her to have sex with him, but immediately regrets afterwards, thinking she'd just turn it down, but surprisingly, she agrees. They go to a hotel, Hazuki takes a bath while Eikichi waits in the bed feeling anxiously eager as this'll be the day he stops being a virgin. He gets so eager that he exhausts himself and then, he starts to think if it's actually right. Hazuki finishes her shower and comes out and then unexpectedly, Eikichi refuses to have it because he’s too nervous and although Eikichi liked her, he didn't want to do it with someone he just met. He says if it's going to be his first time, it should be special. Eikichi now thinks that he's blown the chance to have something happen with him and Hazuki, and leaves the hotel, believing she'd hate him for leaving her alone in the hotel. But to his surprise, somedays later when he arrives back at home, she's right there cooking food for him, after which, they start to go out. After several days of being togethe, one day the two of them come across Shinomi and Takezawa, and he recognises her- she was a member of his gang in the past, but as a man. Then some days later when Eikichi comes to her house as usual, she reveals the truth to him about her being a boy but Eikichi doesn't say anything back. She tells him that she was going to leave by tomorrow to some other town, so if he still wants to be with him(she), Eikichi and him should go together. Eikichi then waits for awhile without saying anything then he leaves. The next day when Hazuki waits for train at the platform, he believes Eikichi would never come. But to his surprise, just as he was leaving, he sees Eikichi waiting for him on the platform. But Eikichi doesn't see him. Hazuki smiles, then goes to the train without meeting Eikichi, thinking it would be better, if he stays back, and forgets about Haruki and leads a normal life. And so, their bittersweet relationship ends, and they never meet again.
 
 A kohai of Ryuji’s from junior high (but apparently the one from which he transferred, since Hino is not familiar with Eikichi), Hino has an intense hatred of Katsuyuki, who gave him the scar on his right eyebrow. Their feud almost separates the Oni-Baku duo, despite Tsukai’s efforts to get everyone to get along, culminating in a fight on the beach where Tsukai beats the crap out of both of them; however by this time the Oni-Baku have already made up. Joey of DOA later beats him up for being in his territory putting up Oni-Baku stickers, but Ryuji forgives him after beating the crap out of about 20 DOA gang members. In the 'feud' in the final volume, he is on Ryuji’s side.
 
 The leader of the Enbutou female biker gang in the Blue Rose coalition, Saya appears in volume 11 after spotting Eikichi and the gang escaping from the police after fighting Joey at the railway. She runs into Eikichi when buying some porn and beers, and the two get talking. She then rides off with her gang. She turns up in volume 12, and clashes with Shinomi over her attempts to seduce Eikichi. In volume 15 she is present at the final fight on the rooftop, and she is one of the few people to stay and show her respects to the Oni-Baku at the end.
 
 This 3rd Year Hatsuchuu Middle School student has a major crush on Ryuji, even collecting photographs in a series of scrapbooks. (Her friends are lusting after Eikichi at the same time.) Her ambition is to get into Tsujikou, despite her brother pointing out the sub-standard school records. She decides she wants to be Ryuji’s girlfriend (obviously she doesn’t know him at all, or she’d have known about Nagisa…) and follows him around, ending up sitting next to him in a pachinko parlour. He helps her win a big payout of balls, but when she goes to thank him he’s already gone. She watches the Oni-Baku clowning around for a while, and somehow gets over her crush. The next day, she receives her results and finds that she can now go to Tsujikou.
 
 A senior member of the Bousou Tenshi/Midnight Angels (Kanburen= Executive Members’ Group), Midouji appears near the end of the Midnight Angels affair with a group of senior members, which shocks Akutsu. They watch the fight between Onizuka and Akutsu, and are present at the conclusion of the race, when Akutsu is carted off to hospital. He also appears at the climactic rooftop battle, and pays his respects later on. Midouji also appears in Bad Company, and is apparently rather humourless and taciturn, as he finds the youthful antics of the new members rather annoying, particularly when the Bousou Tenshi are trying to conduct a serious biking run.
 
 Formerly a member of the SPEED motorcycle gang, Machiruda knows Eikichi's family from the past (the GTO B.A.D. Action 200 II guidebook mentions Onizuka's dad being the first-generation leader of the SPEED gang) and is on good terms with Eikichi during the DOA crisis despite never appearing before then. He now owns a café/restaurant, named after his old gang, with his partner Misako. He is involved in the business with Mafuyu and Zelda.
 
 Misako used to be a member of the Speed motorcycle gang, and appeared to be rather intimidating in the past. She co-owns/manages the Speed café with Machiruda, and now appears very good natured and relaxed (almost stoned, in fact).
 
 The possessor of mighty ‘Chounoryoku’ or psychic powers, Kyoma appears when Harumurata of Gochuu Middle School and Samehara of the Satsuriku Butai, in an attempt to find Makoto, turn up at Tsujikou. They first attack a teacher but are threatened by Kamata and Saejima, but Kyoma turns up and scares them off, since they’ve heard of his reputation. However, it turns out that his powers are limited to lifting girls’ skirts and bursting buttons off people’s coats, which annoys Saejima because such a big deal has been made of it all.
 
 A schoolmate of Nagisa's; he asks her to marry him, despite knowing about Ryuji, but she laughs it off, but agrees to a date with him (at the time she's angry at Ryuji for taking her for granted and only wanting to sleep with her). Ryuji spies on them, but when Saijou asks Nagisa to go with him to Tokyo she turns him down, saying she's already happy. Ryuji makes more of an effort hereafter. He's a skilled karate practitioner, as Ryuji sees through the window of his dojo smashing breeze blocks to powder.
 
 The Original Leader of the 1st generation Midnight Angels gang is Eikichi Onizuka and Ryuji Danma's idol, he is a legendary street racer who died on a corner that Onizuka races Akutsu on. His jacket unique to the entire Midnight Angels gang in the anime is in Onizuka's possession. At the end of the series Onizuka is seen cremating the jacket as a way for honoring him.
 In the GTO manga he makes an appearance in Onizuka's vision urging him to become the greatest teacher in Japan.

Media

Manga
Shonan Junai Gumi is written and illustrated by Tooru Fujisawa. The series was published in Kodansha's Weekly Shōnen Magazine between October 10, 1990 and October 2, 1996. The manga was compiled into thirty-one tankōbon volumes published by Kodansha between March 14, 1991 and December 11, 1996. It has been re-released in a deluxe edition of 15 volumes, from May 12 to December 9, 2005.

In North America, the series was licensed by Tokyopop in 2005. The version released by Tokyopop was the fifteen-volumes deluxe edition by Kodansha. The first volume was released on June 13, 2006, and the series was discontinued after volume 10, published on February 9, 2009. In May 2011, Vertical announced the license of the series. Vertical release started with volume 11, published on February 21, 2012, and volume 15 was published on October 30, 2012.

In November 2013, the December issue of Akita Shoten's Monthly Shōnen Champion announced a sequel spin-off manga to Shonan Junai Gumi, entitled Shonan Seven, starting on January 6, 2014. The manga is written by Fujisawa and illustrated by Shinsuke Takahashi. The series finished on July 6, 2019. Akita Shoten compiled its chapters into seventeen tankōbon volumes, published from June 6, 2014 to September 6, 2019.

Original video animation
An OVA series was produced by J.C. Staff. The series has never been released on DVD.

Episode list

Drama
A five-episode adaptation was made between 1995 and 1997, starring Naoki Miyashita as Onizuka and Yoshiyuki Yamaguchi as Ryuji.

An eight-episode live-action web drama adaptation starring Kanichiro as Onizuka and Daichi Kaneko as Ryuji was released on Amazon Prime Video in Japan on February 28, 2020.

Reception
As of January 2020, the manga had over 45 million copies in circulation.

References

External links
 

1990 manga
1994 anime OVAs
1995 Japanese television series debuts
1997 Japanese television series endings
2020 Japanese television series debuts
2020 Japanese television series endings
Action anime and manga
Amazon Prime Video original programming
Comedy anime and manga
Great Teacher Onizuka
J.C.Staff
Japanese drama television series
Kanagawa Prefecture in fiction
Kodansha manga
Motorcycle television series
Motorcycling in fiction
Shōnen manga
Tokyopop titles
Vertical (publisher) titles
Yankī anime and manga
Japanese high school television series